Friedrich August, Duke of Holstein-Oldenburg (20 September 1711 in Gottorp, Schleswig – 6 July 1785 in Oldenburg) was the son of Christian August, regent of Holstein-Gottorp and his wife Margravine Albertine Friederike of Baden-Durlach.

Marriage and issue
Frederick Augustus married on 21 November 1752 to Princess Ulrike Friederike Wilhelmine of Hesse-Kassel; the couple had three children:
 Peter Friedrich Wilhelm, Duke of Oldenburg (3 January 1754 – 2 July 1823)
 Luise of Holstein-Gottorp-Oldenburg (2 October 1756 – 31 July 1759), died in infancy
 Hedwig Sophie Charlotte (22 March 1759 – 20 June 1818), Queen of Sweden and Norway as wife of Charles XIII of Sweden.

Titular History
Empress Catherine the Great of Russia, on behalf of her son Paul of Russia, last of the Dukes of Holstein-Gottorp, ceded the lands of that duchy to Denmark. In exchange, Denmark ceded the Duchy of Oldenburg to the Prince Bishops of Lübeck, a cadet branch of the Dukes of Gottorp. Thus, Friederich August of Holstein-Gottorp, Prince Bishop of Lübeck, became Duke of Oldenburg.

His son and heir apparent, Peter Friedrich Wilhelm, succeeded him as Wilhelm I, Duke of Oldenburg.

Ancestry

See also

 Rulers of Oldenburg

References

|-

1711 births
1785 deaths
Dukes of Oldenburg
People from Schleswig, Schleswig-Holstein
Lutheran Prince-Bishops of Lübeck